Mazagon Dock Shipbuilders Limited (MDL) (IAST: Majhagānv Dawk Limiṭeḍ), formerly called Mazagon Dock Limited, is a shipyard situated in Mazagaon, Mumbai. It manufactures warships and submarines for the Indian Navy and offshore platforms and associated support vessels for offshore oil drilling. It also builds tankers, cargo bulk carriers, passenger ships and ferries.

MDL is a public sector undertaking managed by the Ministry of Defence, with the Government of India holding an 84.83% stake. Its shipbuilding segment has indigenously built stealth frigates, destroyers, guided-missile destroyers, corvettes, landing platform docks, missile boats, patrol boats, trailing suction hopper dredgers, cargo ships, cargo-passenger ships, platform supply vessels, Voith tugs and BOP vessels, while its submarine segment has built conventional submarines and stealth submarines. Both segments have also performed repair and refit activities.

History
The shipyards of MDL were established in the 18th century. Ownership of the yards passed through entities including the Peninsular and Oriental Steam Navigation Company and the British-India Steam Navigation Company. Eventually, 'Mazagon Dock Limited' was registered as a public company in 1934. The shipyard was nationalised in 1960 and is now a public sector undertaking of the Government of India.

Vice Admiral Narayan Prasad, AVSM, NM, IN (Retd), is the Chairman & Managing Director (CMD) of Mazagon Dock Shipbuilders Limited. The retired naval officer took over his current position on 30 December 2019.

Activities
The activities at the yard are shipbuilding, submarine building, and fabrication of offshore structures. It has manufacturing facilities in Mumbai and Nhava.

The yard has the capability to build warships, submarines, and merchant ships up to 30,000 deadweight tons (DWT). It can fabricate wellhead platforms, process and production platforms, and jack-up rigs for oil exploration.

Naval projects

Warships

Nilgiri-class frigate
The first warship built by MDL was the 2900-ton displacement INS Nilgiri, the lead ship of her class. She was launched on 15 October 1966 and commissioned on 23 June 1972. Five more frigates of this class were built over the next nine years for the Indian Navy.

Godavari-class frigate
While construction of the Nilgiri class was being completed, the Indian Navy proposed requirements for an indigenously designed and built frigate. This new frigate was to be of wholly Indian design and manufacture. To address these requirements, MDL designed and built the  guided-missile frigates with a 3,800-tonne displacement and the ability to embark two helicopters.

Khukri-class corvettes

MDL designed and built the first two vessels of the s for the Indian Navy. The lead vessel of the class was commissioned on 23 August 1989, and the second, on 7 June 1990. The remainder of the class was built at Garden Reach Shipbuilders and Engineers (GRSE) following a transfer of technology from MDL to diversify warship building capabilities to other yards, as well as to make room at MDL for larger projects.

Delhi-class destroyers
The next class of vessels designed and built by MDL was Project 15  guided-missile destroyers. These were powered by gas turbines and displaced 6,200 tonnes. The first of the class, was launched in February 1991 and commissioned on 15 November 1997. The second, was commissioned on 2 June 1999, followed by the last ship in the series, on 22 January 2001.

Shivalik-class frigates

The 6000-ton  (Project 17) frigates are the first warships with stealth features to be designed and built in India. These multi-role, guided-missile frigates have reduced radar signature and have entered service from 2010 onwards.  At least three of this class have been constructed at MDL. The lead vessel of the class was commissioned on 29 April 2010. The last ship of the class, INS Sahyadri, was launched on 27 May 2005 and commissioned on 21 July 2012.

Kolkata-class destroyers
 vessels are the next-generation of guided-missile destroyers in the 7,400-tonne range to be designed and built at MDL. They incorporate stealth features. The lead vessel of the class was launched on 30 March 2006. At least three vessels of the class were planned. All three are in active service.

Visakhapatnam-class destroyers

 vessels are the next-generation of guided-missile destroyers in the 7,500-tonne range to be designed and built at MDL. They incorporate stealth features and improved weapons and avionics compared to the Kolkata class. The lead vessel of the class was launched in 2018. At least four vessels of the class are planned.

Nilgiri-class frigates
 vessels are the next-generation of guided-missile Frigates in the 6,500-tonne range to be designed and built at MDL and GRSE. They incorporate stealth features. The lead vessel of the class was launched on 28 September 2019. At least seven vessels of the class are planned. Four will be built by MDL, while the rest three by GRSE.

Coast Guard vessels
The yard builds offshore patrol vessels (OPVs) for the Indian Coast Guard. These vessels are specialised ships built for patrolling, policing, search and rescue operations in India's exclusive economic zone. Each carries a helicopter on board. Seven such ships have been delivered to the Coast Guard.

Floating police stations
Based on the order by the BSF, the yard started construction of floating border outposts (BOPs). Essentially these BOPs are floating police stations with four high-speed boats. The yard has delivered 9 out of an order of 14 BOPs.

Other vessels
Among other ships, the yard has built three fast missile boats, a cadet training ship, and other utility ships for the Indian Navy. It has also built  water tankers for the Iranian naval forces.

Submarines

Shishumar-class submarine

The s are a variant of the Type 209 diesel-electric submarine designed by Howaldtswerke-Deutsche Werft. Two vessels of this class were constructed at MDL.

Kalvari-class submarine
MDL is building six diesel-electric submarines of the  under a technology-transfer agreement with DCNS. , the first in this class, was commissioned by Indian Prime Minister Narendra Modi on 14 December 2017 from Naval Dockyard in Mumbai.

Commercial projects

Offshore platforms
MDL builds offshore oil drilling platforms. It operates facilities at Alcock, Mumbai, and Nhava Yard for the construction of platforms with wellhead, water injection and production separator and glycol process capabilities, as well as jackup rigs, SBMs and other offshore structures.

Repair and maintenance jobs on offshore rigs are undertaken at Alcock; jackets up to  length and 2,200-tonne weight can be constructed. At Nhava, jackets up to  length and 2,300-tonne weight, main decks up to 550-tonne weight and helipads of 160-tonne weight can be constructed.

The yard builds specialist vessels able to clean oil spills and fight fires on offshore drilling platforms.

A welding training school develops and maintains welding techniques and procedures.

See also
 Cochin Shipyard
 Garden Reach Shipbuilders and Engineers
 Goa Shipyard Limited
 Hindustan Shipyard

References

External links 
 Website

Indian Navy
Shipbuilding companies of India
Government-owned companies of India
Manufacturing companies based in Mumbai
Mumbai docks
Vehicle manufacturing companies established in 1934
Companies nationalised by the Government of India
Indian companies established in 1934
Companies listed on the National Stock Exchange of India
Companies listed on the Bombay Stock Exchange